Colaspis hesperia is a species of leaf beetle from North America. Its range spans from Arizona to Texas and south to Mexico. The specific name, hesperia, is derived from the Greek for "western".

References

Further reading

 

Eumolpinae
Articles created by Qbugbot
Taxa named by Doris Holmes Blake
Beetles described in 1974
Beetles of North America